William N. Goetzmann (born February 4, 1956) is the Edwin J. Beinecke Professor of Finance and Management Studies at the Yale School of Management, and a research associate of the National Bureau of Economic Research.  In 2018, he received the James R. Vertin Award by the Chartered Financial Analysts Institute Research Foundation "for a body of research notable for its relevance and enduring value to investment professionals".

Early life and education

Goetzmann is the son of Pulitzer and Parkman Prize-winning historian, William H. Goetzmann, and Mewes Mueller Goetzmann.

He graduated from Yale College in 1978 with a degree in Art History and Archaeology, earned his MBA in 1986 from the Yale School of Management, and his Ph.D. from Yale University in Operations Research with a dissertation on topics in finance in 1990.

Prior to his academic career, Goetzmann worked as an archaeologist, a writer and producer of PBS documentaries, and served as the director of the American Museum of Western Art in Denver, Colorado during 1984–85.

Academic career

Roles

Goetzmann was made an assistant professor of finance at Columbia University Graduate School of Business beginning in 1990  and returned to Yale as an associate professor at the Yale School of Management in 1994, where he is currently a chaired professor.  Since January 2021, he has served as the Executive Editor of the Financial Analysts Journal.  He is the faculty director of the International Center for Finance at the Yale School of Management, and faculty director of the school's Executive MBA program in Asset Management.

Research

His research focuses on asset management, investor behavior, and the history of global capital markets.  He has written widely cited papers about investment fund performance, real estate, the long-term history of stock markets the economics of the art market.  Following the 2008 financial crisis, Goetzmann co-authored a 2009 research report with Andrew Ang and Stephen Schaefer for the Norwegian Ministry of Finance evaluating the sovereign wealth fund's use of active management. This research provided ground-breaking recommendations on the use of factor investing for institutional portfolios.

Works

He has authored and co-edited a number of books, including Money Changes Everything: How Finance Made Civilization Possible, a history of finance from antiquity to the modern era, and The Great Mirror of Folly: Finance, Culture, and the Great Crash of 1720, about the world's first global stock market bubble. In 2020, he was featured in the newsletter, Yale Insights, with an article and a video that focus on the global financial bubbles that have occurred since the one that crashed in 1720.

References

External links 
 William Goetzmann's website
 William Goetzmann's Yale SOM faculty website
 SSRN Research and Papers

1956 births
Living people
Yale College alumni
Yale School of Management alumni
Yale University alumni
Yale School of Management faculty
American economic historians
American finance and investment writers
Historians of economic thought
20th-century American non-fiction writers
21st-century American non-fiction writers
Academic journal editors